Kurt E. Kimmel FRPSL RDP (born 17 March 1941) is a Swiss banker and philatelist who signed the Roll of Distinguished Philatelists in 2004. He is a member of the FIP's Postal History Commission Bureau.

Selected publications
 Ceylon: The Pence issues. Royal Philatelic Society London, London, 2020. (With Patrick Pearson)

References 

Living people
1941 births
Swiss bankers
Fellows of the Royal Philatelic Society London
Signatories to the Roll of Distinguished Philatelists